Raja is a 1972 Indian Tamil-language spy film directed by C. V. Rajendran. The film stars Sivaji Ganesan, Jayalalithaa and K. Balaji. It is a remake of the Hindi film Johny Mera Naam. The film was released on 26 January 1972, and became successful at the box office.

Plot

Cast 
Sivaji Ganesan as Raja/Sekar
Jayalalithaa as Radha
K. Balaji as Chandran/Babu
S. V. Ranga Rao as Nagalingam Boopathy
Major Sundarrajan as Prasanth
R. S. Manohar as Viswam
V. S. Raghavan as Dharmalingam Boopathy
J. P. Chandrababu as Pattabiraman/Seetharaman
Pandari Bai as Parvathi
Ganthimathi as Radha Mother's
V. Nagayya as Haridass
K. Kannan as Jambu
Master Sekhar as Young Raja

Production 
Raja is a remake of the 1970 Hindi film Johny Mera Naam. A. C. Tirulokchandar was initially chosen to direct the film but he left due to personal reasons. Sivaji Ganesan later successfully recommended C. V. Rajendran as director.

Soundtrack 
The music was composed by M. S. Viswanathan, with lyrics by Kannadasan.

Re-release 
A digitally restored version of the film was released in May 2018.

References

External links 
 

1970s spy films
1970s Tamil-language films
1972 films
Films directed by C. V. Rajendran
Films scored by M. S. Viswanathan
Indian spy films
Tamil remakes of Hindi films